Hooghly Chinsurah Municipality is the civic body that governs Hugli-Chuchura and its surrounding areas (Bandel) in Chinsurah subdivision of Hooghly district, West Bengal, India.

History
Hooghly Chinsurah Municipality was established in 1865. It was formed by the amalgamation of the Hooghly and Chinsurah towns, primarily with the objective of local governance and tax collection. Cockrell was its first Chairman and G.S. Park its first vice chairman.

As the ancient port city of Satgaon declined, Hooghly was founded by the Portuguese in 1537. It was later acquired by the British. Chinsurah was developed as a Dutch settlement in the 17th century. It passed into British hands in exchange for their possessions in Sumatra.

Notable residents 

 Hazi Md Mahashin
 Bhudev Mukherjee
 Ramgati Nayaratna
 Kaji Nazrul Islam
 Joytish Ch Ghosh
 Gopesh Chandra Mallick (Freedom Fighter)
 Bijoy Modak
 U.L. Brahmachari (Scientist)
 Sambhunath Dey
 Narayan Ch Ghosh (Mathematician)
 Manoranjan Porel (Athlete)
 Dr. Murari Mukherjee
 Akshay Chandra Sarkar
 Ganga charan sarkar
 Dinanath dhar
 Bankim Chandra Chatterjee

Geography

Hooghly Chinsurah Municipality covers an area of 17.29 sq km and has a total population of 177,833 (2011).

In 1981, 24.72% of the total population formed main workers and 75.28% were non-workers in Hooghly Chinsurah Municipality and 25.49% of the total main workers were industrial workers. This may be interpreted as follows: although industrial activities are prominent in the municipal areas of the region, the major portion of the population is commuters and migrants find employment in the area.

Healthcare
Hugli District Hospital with 550 beds, Chunchura Police Hospital with 98 beds and Hugli Jail Hospital with 27 beds are located in the Hooghly Chinsurah Municipality area.

Elections
In the 2015 municipal elections for Hooghly Chinsurah Municipality, Trinamool Congress won 25 seats, CPI(M) 3 seats, Forward Bloc 1 seat and Congress 1 seat.

In the 2010 municipal elections for Hooghly Chinsurah Municipality, Trinamool Congress won 24 seats, CPI (M) 3 seats, Forward Bloc 2 seats and Congress won 1 seat.

About the 2010 municipal elections, The Guardian wrote, "Today's municipal elections are unlike any for decades: the Communists, who have held West Bengal's main towns almost without a break since the 1970s, are facing disaster… This time defeat is likely to be definitive and could signal the beginning of the end for the Communist Party of India-Marxist (CPIM)."

In the 2005 municipal elections for Hooghly Chinsurah Municipality, CPI (M) won 15 seats, RSP 2 seats, Forward Bloc 1 seat, Congress 3 seats and Trinamool Congress 9 seats.

Wards
Details of the wards, with 2015 municipal election results, are as follows:

This is a broad indication of the neighbourhood covered, not a full description

References

 

Municipalities of West Bengal